Robert Cohen may refer to:
 Robert Cohen (writer) (born 1963), Canadian comedy writer
 Robert Cohen (novelist) (born 1957), American novelist and short fiction writer
 Robert Cohen (playwright) (born 1938), American university professor, theatre director, playwright, and drama critic
 Robert Cohen (boxer) (1930–2022), French boxer and bantamweight champion
 Robert Cohen (cellist) (born 1959), British cellist
 Robert B. Cohen (1925–2012), American businessman and founder of Hudson News
 Robert Donald Cohen (1933–2014), British physician
 Robert Waley Cohen (1877–1952), British industrialist and leader of Anglo-Jewry
  (born 1941), film director from Switzerland
 Rob Cohen (born 1949), American film director, producer and writer (XXX and The Fast and the Furious)
 Bobby Cohen (born 1970), American film producer (The Cider House Rules and Memoirs of a Geisha)
 Robert J. Cohen (born 1948), American executive director
 Robert Stephan Cohen (born 1939), American divorce attorney
 Robert E. Cohen (born 1947), American chemical engineer
 Rob Cohen (record producer), American record producer

See also
 Cohen (surname)